Crenatula is a genus in the family Pteriidae.

References 

 Tëmkin I. (2010) Molecular phylogeny of pearl oysters and their relatives (Mollusca, Bivalvia, Pterioidea). BMC Evolutionary Biology 10: 342

External links 
 
  
 Crenatula at Biolib.cz
 Crenatula at the World Register of Marine Species (WoRMS)

Pteriidae
Bivalve genera